Vladimir Dragičević (Serbian Cyrillic: Владимир Драгичевић; born May 30, 1986) is a retired Montenegrin professional basketball player who last played for Aris of the Greek Basket League.

Professional career
Dragičević made his senior debut with Lovćen Cetinje and later played for Budućnost Podgorica. In April 2011, he signed with Caja Laboral of the Spanish ACB League for the rest of the 2010–11 season.

In July 2011, Dragičević signed a two-year deal with Spartak Saint Petersburg of Russia.

In October 2013, he signed with Stelmet Zielona Góra of Poland for the 2013–14 season. In November 2013, he was named Euroleague MVP for Round 6.

In September 2014, he signed a one-year deal with Banvit. For the next season, he moved to TED Ankara Kolejliler.

On November 20, 2016, he re-signed with Stelmet Zielona Góra.

Montenegro national team
Dragičević played for the Montenegro national basketball team at the FIBA EuroBasket 2011.

Career statistics

EuroLeague

|-
| style="text-align:left;"| 2013–14
| style="text-align:left;"| Zielona Góra
| 10 || 9 || 27.9 || .641 || .000 || .577 || 6.7 || 1.5 || .6 || .9 || 14.7 || 18.7
|- class="sortbottom"
| style="text-align:center;" colspan=2 | Career
| 10 || 9 || 27.9 || .641 || .000 || .577 || 6.7 || 1.5 || .6 || .9 || 14.7 || 18.7

References

External links

 Vladimir Dragičević at eurobasket.com
 Vladimir Dragičević at euroleague.com
 Vladimir Dragičević at fiba.com
 Vladimir Dragičević at tblstat.net

1986 births
Living people
ABA League players
Aris B.C. players
Bandırma B.İ.K. players
Basket Zielona Góra players
BC Nizhny Novgorod players
BC Spartak Saint Petersburg players
Centers (basketball)
KK Budućnost players
KK Lovćen players
Liga ACB players
Montenegrin expatriate basketball people in Poland
Montenegrin expatriate basketball people in Russia
Montenegrin expatriate basketball people in Spain
Montenegrin expatriate basketball people in Turkey
Montenegrin men's basketball players
Power forwards (basketball)
Saski Baskonia players
Sportspeople from Cetinje
TED Ankara Kolejliler players